The Waterford Viking Triangle is part of the cultural and heritage area in Waterford City. It is so called because of the 1000-year-old Viking walls which once surrounded it. The sites within the "triangle" include Reginald's Tower (which contains the Viking Museum) as well as the Medieval Museum and the Bishop's Palace Museum, collectively known as Waterford Museum of Treasures.

Sites

Reginald's Tower

The best-known building in the Viking Triangle is Reginald's Tower, the oldest urban civic building in the country, situated on the Quays/The Mall, in Waterford. It has performed various functions over the years and today is a civic museum.

Waterford Crystal
The Waterford Crystal factory and showroom are on The Mall, which is just to the south of the Triangle. Guided tours are available for the factory.

Waterford Treasures
There are three museums in the Viking Triangle - collectively known as Waterford Museum of Treasures. The Viking Museum is housed in Reginald's Tower. The Medieval Museum and Bishop's Palace Museum are close to Cathedral Square.

The Medieval Museum includes two medieval chambers, the 13th-century Choristers’ Hall and the 15th-century Mayor’s Wine Vault. The only piece of clothing from Henry VIII, a cloth cap, is housed in the museum.

The Bishop's Palace Museum is a 250-year-old Georgian structure and contains artifacts dating from 17th century Waterford to the present.

French Church
Another much on Bailey's New St./Greyfriars is the French Church (Greyfriars Abbey), a Friary dating from the 13th century.

Other

A replica Viking longship is exhibited beside Reginald's Tower. It was built by a local shipwright and sailed locally before going to its present exhibition space on Parade Quay. Cathedral Square is the site of Christchurch Cathedral; nearby is the Theatre Royal and other historical landmarks. The Mall (close to Waterford Crystal) is the building where Thomas Francis Meagher held meetings and which first saw the Irish Tricolour flag in 1848.

References

External links
 Viking Triangle
 Waterford Treasures Museums
 Viking Triangle tour on YouTube
 Waterford Crystal
 Paper - The Historical Importance of Viking Age Waterford

Buildings and structures in Waterford (city)
City museums
Culture in Waterford (city)
Local museums in the Republic of Ireland
Tourist attractions in Waterford (city)
Religious museums in Ireland
Museums in County Waterford